James or Jim Sheridan may refer to:

 Jim Sheridan (politician) (1952–2022), Scottish Labour Party politician 
 James Sheridan (footballer) (1882–1960), Irish footballer in England
 James Sheridan (Medal of Honor) (1830–1893), American Civil War sailor
 James E. Sheridan (1922–2015), professor of history and author
 Jim Sheridan (born 1949), Irish film director
 Jamey Sheridan (James Patrick Sheridan, born 1951), American actor
 James Joseph Sheridan (1951–2014), Irish pianist, composer, arranger and music historian